Paul Anen (3 February 1918 – 29 May 1978) was a Luxembourgian épée fencer. He competed at the 1948 and 1952 Summer Olympics.

References

External links
 

1918 births
1978 deaths
Luxembourgian male épée fencers
Olympic fencers of Luxembourg
Fencers at the 1948 Summer Olympics
Fencers at the 1952 Summer Olympics
People from Differdange